Torkil Eyðfinsson Veyhe (born 9 January 1990) is a Faroese former professional road bicycle racer, who rode professionally between 2017 and 2020 for ,  and . He also rode for the national cycling team of the Faroe Islands at the Island Games, winning two gold medals, four silver medals and two bronze medals. In 2016 he rode for the Danish national team at the Danmark Rundt and in 2017 at the European Road Championships in the men's road race. Earlier he rode for the DCU team Team WeBike–CK Aarhus, the Danish club Odder Cykel Klub and the Faroese club Tórshavnar Súkklufelag. In 2016 he won his first A-race in Denmark and his first UCI points.

Background and education 
Torkil Veyhe comes from the Faroe Islands, from the capital Tórshavn. He started as a cyclist there and soon became a multiple Faroese Champion as well as multiple winner of Tour of Faroe Islands (Kring Føroyar) road race. After finishing the Higher Commercial Examination Programme (HHX) in Tórshavn in 2010, Veyhe moved to Aarhus in Denmark to study for Engineer and to compete in Danish cycling competitions. First he took one year of preparation for the education he wanted to study, and the following year he started the education. He took the Bachelor of Engineering (B.E.) in Structural Engineering from the Aarhus University  School of Engineering in 2014. The same year he continued to study for the Master of Science in Engineering degree which he finished in 2016. Veyhe defended his MS final thesis on the day after competing at the Danish Championships time trial, where he was number 9, and two days after the exam he competed at the Danish Championships road race, hitting an early break out together with three other cyclists Chris Anker Sørensen, Michael Reihs, and Mark Sehested Pedersen. After the Danish Championships he was elected for the Danish national team.

Career as a cyclist

He has won competitions like Island Games in 2015 and Kring Føroyar in 2009, 2010, 2012, 2014, 2015 and 2017. He was Faroese champion in the time trial and in road race 2009. Veyhe competed at several events at the 2007 Island Games in Rhodes.

Torkil Veyhe moved to live in Denmark to study and at the same time he continued to cycle on a high level. The first years in Denmark, he competed in lower class, but soon he won a 124-km race in Hjørring for license cyclists in the B class. After competing in five races in Denmark in 2013 he was promoted to the A class. Veyhe competed at the 2013 Island Games in Bermuda where he took two silver medals. In June 2015 he took bronze in the Nishiki Løbet 2015 (Nishiki Race 2015) in Randers. Veyhe won the first Faroese gold medal at the 2015 Island Games, when he took gold in the men's individual time trial on 28 June 2015. He also won bronze in the men's road race at the 2015 Island Games.

On 15 October 2015 Veyhe got a two-year agreement with Tryggingarfelagið Føroyar (a Faroese insurance company), which will support him financially until October 2017.

After joining Team We-Bike CK Aarhus in November 2015 he sat two goals for 2016, he would win an A-race and he would win his first UCI points. In April and May 2016 both goals were achieved, he won his first 3 UCI points when finishing as number eight at the Himmerland Rundt UCI category 1.2 on 29 April 2016 and two weeks later he won the A-race JE.DK in Herning. After the Danish Championships in June 2016 he was elected to ride for the Danish national team at the Danmark Rundt, along with teammate Niklas Pedersen. At the third stage he won the combativity award.

In 2017, Veyhe was the winner of the Faroese National Road Race Championships in front of Helgi W. Olsen and Jan Hjaltalin. He also won the  time trial by more than three minutes, and the criterium.

Major results

2007
 Island Games
2nd Team road race
8th Time trial
2009
 2nd Team road race, Island Games (with Eli Christiansen, Gunnar Dahl-Olsen, Bogi Kristiansen & Sigmund Olsson)
2013
 Island Games
2nd Time trial
2nd Road race
2015
 Island Games
1st Time trial
3rd Road race
3rd Team time trial
2016
 1st JE.DK Løbet Herning
 1st Pinsecuppen
 2nd Sønderborg-Post Cup
 2nd Designa løbet
 2nd Post Cup
 4th Hjørring-Sparekassen Vendsyssel
 5th Grenaa CC
 8th Himmerland Rundt
 8th Kolding BC
 9th Time trial, Danish National Road Championships
 9th GP Horsens Posten
 Combativity award, Stage 3 Danmark Rundt
2017
 Island Games
1st Time trial
2nd Criterium
3rd Team road race
3rd Team time trial
5th Road race
 Faroese National Championships
1st Road race
1st Time trial
1st Criterium
 1st DCU-A Rødekro
 3rd GP Horsens
 3rd Skive-Løbet
 5th Fyen Rundt
 6th Overall Danmark Rundt
 6th GP Herning
 7th Edlund Løbet
 8th Overall Ronde van Midden-Nederland
 10th Time trial, Danish National Road Championships
 Tour des Fjords
Most active rider, Stages 1 & 4

References

External links 

Torkil Veyhe on feltet.dk

1990 births
Living people
Faroese male cyclists
People from Tórshavn
Danish male cyclists